William J. Tierney  (May 14, 1858 – September 21, 1898) was a Major League Baseball player. He played for the  1882 Cincinnati Red Stockings of the American Association and the 1884 Baltimore Monumentals of the Union Association.

External links

Major League Baseball first basemen
Major League Baseball outfielders
Cincinnati Red Stockings (AA) players
Baltimore Monumentals players
Baseball players from Massachusetts
19th-century baseball players
1858 births
1898 deaths
Lynn Live Oaks players